South Carolina Highway 311 (SC 311) is a  state highway in the southeastern part of the U.S. state of South Carolina.

Route description
SC 311 begins at an intersection with U.S. Route 176 (US 176) in Sandridge. The route heads northeast, and then east to its eastern terminus, an intersection with SC 6, south of Cross.

SC 311 is not part of the National Highway System, a system of roadways important to the nation's economy, defense, and mobility.

History

Major intersections

See also

References

External links

 
 SC 311 at Virginia Highways' South Carolina Highways Annex

311
Transportation in Berkeley County, South Carolina